The Office for Democratic Institutions and Human Rights (ODIHR) is the principal institution of the Organization for Security and Cooperation in Europe (OSCE) dealing with the "human dimension" of security. The Office, originally established in 1991 under the 1990 Paris Charter as the Office for Free Elections, is still best known for its role in observing elections although its name changed in 1992 to reflect the broadening of its by the Helsinki Summit.

Based in Warsaw, Poland, ODIHR is active throughout the 57 participating States of the OSCE. It assists governments in meeting their commitments as participating States of the OSCE in the areas of elections, human rights, democracy, rule of law, and tolerance and non-discrimination. The Office also hosts the organization's Contact Point for Roma and Sinti Issues.

On 4 December 2020, Matteo Mecacci of Italy, received a nomination for the position of ODIHR's Director.

In 2021 the Office had a budget of €16 million and employed 146 people, of which a supermajority were women.

ODIHR activities 
The ODIHR has observed more than elections across the OSCE region and has deployed some 75,000 observers.

The Office organizes the annual OSCE Human Dimension Implementation Meeting in Warsaw, Europe's largest human rights conference.

ODIHR international electoral observer activities 
 During the United States elections, 2012—following media reports that tied ODIHR international electoral observers to the United Nations and accused them of having plans to interfere in the election—the observers, who said they were in the United States to review several benchmarks of democratic elections, were blocked from polls in nine of the 50 states—Alabama, Alaska, Florida, Iowa, Michigan, Mississippi, Ohio, Pennsylvania, and Texas.

ODIHR Directors

See also
List of human rights organizations

References

External links
 Official website

Intergovernmental human rights organizations
International organisations or its agencies based in Warsaw
Organization for Security and Co-operation in Europe

he:הארגון לביטחון ולשיתוף פעולה באירופה#המשרד למוסדות דמוקרטיים וזכויות אדם